The Ionian Academy was the first Greek academic institution established in modern times. It was located in Corfu. It was established by the French during their administration of the island as the département of Corcyre, and became a university during the British administration, through the actions of Frederick North, 5th Earl of Guilford in 1824. It is also considered the precursor of the Ionian University. It had Philological, Law, and Medical Schools.

The first period of existence of its Medical School was from 1824 to 1828. The second from 1844 to 1865 (when the Ionian islands united with Greece). Many of the physicians at the academy had followed the traditional path of studying in Italy, and in particular at the medical School of Bologna. Their scientific and educational activities in establishing the high level of the Medical School influenced the Greek medical science as a whole. In particular, George Therianos (Prof of General and Comparative Anatomy and Experimental Physics) from the island of Zante (Zakynthos) met the Earl of Guilford in 1825 in England and was given the position of professor of the academy's Medical School.

Giovanni Carandino (Ioannis Karantinos), who had already learnt mathematics with Charles Dupin at the original Ionian Academy established by the French during their occupation of the Septinsular Republic (1807–1824), was sent by Lord Guilford to study at the École Polytechnique in Paris, France, in Italy and in England between 1820 and 1823, and became the director of the school of Mathematics at the academy.

The academy gave Public courses in Sciences, Ethics and humanities, it offered subjects like, Physiology, Botany, political economy and Penal and Civil law.

George Bowen was president of the Academy 1847-1851 and later first governor of Queensland.

After the union of the Ionian Islands to the Kingdom of Greece in 1864, the Ionian Academy was closed to support the newly established University of Athens. Parts of the staff moved to Athens and also the library was brought there.

See also
List of modern universities in Europe (1801–1945)

Notes

References
Miller, W., The Ottoman Empire and its Successors: 1801-1927 (London, 1966)
History of the Ionian Academy from the Ionian University website
Pentogalos G.H., the Medical School of Ionian Academy (1824–1828 and 1844–1865). Ph.D. Thesis, Univ.of Thessaloniki, 1980.

Buildings and structures in Corfu (city)
United States of the Ionian Islands
Universities in Greece
Educational institutions established in 1807
1807 establishments in France
1807 establishments in the Ottoman Empire
19th-century establishments in Greece
Educational institutions disestablished in 1814
1814 disestablishments in France
1810s disestablishments in the Ottoman Empire
1814 disestablishments in Europe
19th-century disestablishments in Greece
Educational institutions established in 1824
1824 establishments in the British Empire
1824 establishments in Greece
Educational institutions disestablished in 1864
1864 disestablishments in the British Empire
1864 disestablishments in Greece
Italianate architecture in Greece